The Wells Tavern is a Grade II listed public house at 30 Well Walk, Hampstead, London.

It was built in about 1849.

References

External links
 

Grade II listed buildings in the London Borough of Camden
Grade II listed pubs in London
Buildings and structures in Hampstead
Pubs in the London Borough of Camden
1849 establishments in England